The Duo is a 2011 South Korean historical drama series, starring Chun Jung-myung, Lee Sang-yoon, Han Ji-hye and Seo Hyun-jin. It aired on MBC from February 7 to May 24, 2011 on Mondays and Tuesdays at 21:55 for 32 episodes.

Filmed at MBC Dramia in Gyeonggi Province, the series examines how class determines fate during the Joseon era through two men who swap lives. Switched at birth, Chun-doong and Gwi-dong grow up living each other's lives. Nobleman's son Chun-doong endures great hardships in the lowest caste of society, and becomes a vigilante who steals from the rich. Beggar's son Gwi-dong grows up in a wealthy noble family, and becomes a police chief. Living on opposite sides of the law, their paths cross again when they both fall for the same woman; played by Chun, Lee and Han respectively.

Plot
Around the time of late Joseon Dynasty (1392-1910) when hierarchy between nobles and slaves started to fall apart and riots were common among peasants, two men were born on the same day and at the same time. Chun Dung who grew up in a beggar's quarters (although born as a noble) with no knowledge of his parents, dreams of "making this world a better place" by taking part in the peasants’ riot while Gwi Dong who was raised in a noble life (though he was born as a beggar), serves as a police official, fights against corruption within the government and speaks for the weak. Although both give their hearts to the same woman, they become the greatest duo ever in order to reform the problematic world.

The background of the drama is not set in a grand palace but an everyday market and talks not of the success of a great hero but the agony of common people. The Duo portrays the everyday lives and loves of the commoners and outcasts during 19th century Korea: Slaves, beggars, leather shoemakers, thieves, street bums and butchers, people who were poor yet good at heart. It is centered on the humanism and sentiments of those whose life stories have often been neglected in the typical "royal family centered" dramas.

Cast

Main characters
Chun Jung-myung as Chun-doong
 Noh Young-hak as young Chun-doong
 He was born as a noble but lives Gwi-dong's life as a beggar and later becomes a heroic outlaw.
Lee Sang-yoon as Gwi-dong 
 Choi Woo-shik as young Gwi-dong
 He was born as a beggar but lives his life as a noble and later becomes a police chief.
Han Ji-hye as Dong-nyeo
 Jin Se-yeon as young Dong-nyeo
 The daughter of a village school teacher, she is learned and clever.
Seo Hyun-jin as Dal-yi
Lee Sun-young as young Dal-yi
 Ever since she was a kid, she has always loved Gwi-dong who was from a class different and more importantly, higher than hers.

Supporting characters

 Lee Moon-sik as Jang Kkok-ji
 Jung In-gi as Soe-dol
 Yoon Yoo-sun as Mak-soon
 Kwon Oh-joong as Kang Po-soo
 Seo Yi-sook as Keun-nyeo
 Ahn Yeon-hong as Ja Geun-nyeon
 Jung Kyung-ho as Kkul-tteok
 Cha Do-jin as Jin-deuk
 Park Dae-won as young Jin-deuk
 Lee Shin-sung as Do-gap
 Choi Woo-hyuk as young Do-gap
 Kim Ki-bang as Gom-chi
 Jo Chang-geun as Poong-gae
 Kim Kyung-jin as Mal-son
 Choi Jong-hwan as Dr. Kim Jae-ik
 Im Chae-won as Lady Kwon
 Lee Seol-ah as Geum-ok
 Kim So-hyun as young Geum-ok
 Kim Myung-soo as Hyun-gam
 Jung Han-hun as Mr. Park
 Ra Mi-ran as Eob Deuk-ne
 Lee Ji-soo as Sam-wol
 Kang Shin-il as Sung Cho-shi
 Baek Jong-hak as Yoo Sun-dal
 Im Hyun-sik as old man Hwang
 Yoon Yong-hyun as Choon-bo
 Gong Hyung-jin as Gong Po-gyo
 Jung Chan as Jo Sun-dal
 Jang Yong-hee as Pan-sool
 Chi Woo as young Pan-sool
 Im Dae-ho as Beot-deul's father 
 Yang Mi-kyung as Chun-doong's mother
Yoon Hong-bin as young Won-chil
Baek Sung-heum as young Beot-deul
Kim Woo-suk as young Se-gap

Ratings
The Duo received solid ratings, averaging 13.0 percent on Total National Multimedia Statistics' (TNmS) chart and 16.7 percent on AGB Nielsen Media Research's (AGB) poll, coming in first in its primetime slot several times during its run.

International broadcast
 It aired in Vietnam on Style TV, beginning August 16, 2014.

References

External links
 The Duo official MBC website 
 

MBC TV television dramas
Korean-language television shows
2011 South Korean television series debuts
2011 South Korean television series endings
Television series set in the Joseon dynasty
South Korean historical television series
South Korean action television series
Television series by Pan Entertainment